Louis or Lewis Bush may refer to:
Louis Jean Bush, 19th-century Louisiana politician
Lewis Bush (1969–2011), American football player
Lewis Bush (photographer) (born 1988), British photographer

See also
Lou Busch (1910–1979), American musician